The Asus Eee T91 is a touchscreen netbook from the Asus Eee PC range. It is similar in specification to other netbooks, but features an 8.9" rotatable touchscreen and a retractable stylus.

With the release of Windows 7, Asus released the T91MT with a capacitive touchscreen, designed for multitouch.

Development

Details of the T91 were first released at CES 2009. It was known to have a standard netbook configuration, with the addition of a rotatable touchscreen which could be used as an input. It was expected to be released in summer 2009, and was officially released on the week beginning 1 June.

Features and specifications

The netbook has a fairly average specification with respect to other models. Its specifications are:
Intel Atom Z520 Processor
1GB RAM
16GB solid state drive, 16GB SD Card, 20GB Eee Storage
8.9" LED-lit resistive touchscreen (1024x600)
0.3MP webcam and microphone above screen
1 VGA port (D-sub 15-pin for external monitor)
2 USB 2.0 ports
2 SD Card slots
2 Audio jacks: Headphone / Mic-in
WLAN 802.11b/g/n (draft)
Bluetooth V2.1
225mm x 164 mm x 25.2-28.4 mm
0.96 kg weight
Windows XP Home
Tablet-specific software ("touchsuite") for taking notes, presenting images and touch-enabled browsing with an on-screen keyboard

See also 
 Comparison of Netbooks (example: Asus EEE T101MT)

References

Eee T91
Netbooks